The 2019–20 Philadelphia Flyers season was the 53rd season for the National Hockey League franchise that was established on June 5, 1967. This is also the first season with head coach Alain Vigneault.

The season was suspended by the league officials on March 12, 2020, after several other professional and collegiate sports organizations followed suit as a result of the ongoing COVID-19 pandemic. On May 26, the NHL regular season was officially declared over with the remaining games being cancelled. The Flyers returned to the playoffs after missing them in the 2018–19 season and played in a round-robin tournament, capturing the first seed for the playoffs for the first time since the 1999–2000 season. The Flyers defeated the Montreal Canadiens in the first round, but were defeated in seven games by the New York Islanders in the second round.

Standings

Divisional standings

Eastern Conference

Schedule and results

Preseason
The preseason schedule was published on June 18, 2019.

Regular season
The regular season schedule was published on June 25, 2019.

Playoffs 

The Flyers played in a round-robin tournament to determine their seed for the playoffs. Philadelphia finished with a 3−0−0 record and clinched the first seed for the playoffs.

The Flyers faced the Montreal Canadiens in the first round,  and eliminated them in six games, winning their first playoff series since the 2011–2012 season.

In the second round, the Flyers faced the New York Islanders, but lost in seven games.

Player statistics

Skaters

Goaltenders

†Denotes player spent time with another team before joining the Flyers. Stats reflect time with the Flyers only.
‡Denotes player was traded mid-season. Stats reflect time with the Flyers only.
Bold/italics denotes franchise record.

Awards and records

Awards

Records

Among the team records set during the 2019–20 season was tying the mark originally set in 2003 for most overtime games in a single playoff series, three, during their round two matchup with the New York Islanders.

Suspensions and fines

Transactions
The Flyers have been involved in the following transactions during the 2019–20 season.

Trades

Players acquired

Players lost

Signings

Draft picks

Below are the Philadelphia Flyers' selections at the 2019 NHL Entry Draft, which was held on June 21 and 22, 2019, at the Rogers Arena in Vancouver, British Columbia.

Notes

References
General
 
 
 

Specific

Philadelphia Flyers seasons
Philadelphia Flyers
Flyers
Flyers